Guðmunda Brynja Óladóttir (born 3 January 1994) is an Icelandic footballer who plays as a forward for KR. She started her career with Selfoss. In 2013, she was named the Úrvalsdeild Young Player of the Year. She was the captain of the Selfoss team when it went to the Icelandic Cup final in 2015.

National team career
Guðmunda debuted for the Icelandic national team in 2013.

Honours 
UMF Selfoss
Runners-up
 Icelandic Women's Cup: 2014
 Icelandic Women's Cup: 2015

References

External links 
 

1994 births
Living people
Gudmunda Oladottir
Gudmunda Oladottir
Gudmunda Oladottir
Klepp IL players
Toppserien players
Gudmunda Oladottir
Gudmunda Oladottir
Gudmunda Oladottir
Gudmunda Oladottir
Women's association football forwards